Michael Matthews may refer to:

Michael Matthews (American football) (born 1983), American football tight end
Michael Matthews (cyclist) (born 1990), Australian cyclist
Michael Matthews (composer) (born 1950), Canadian composer
Michael Matthews (cricketer) (1914–1940), English cricketer
Michael Matthews (director), South African director
Michael J. Matthews (1934–2014), U.S. politician
Michael R. Matthews (born 1948), Australian philosopher of science
Michael Gough Matthews (1931–2013), British pianist, teacher and musical administrator
Mickey Matthews (born 1953), head football coach
Mike Matthews (born 1973), baseball pitcher